Bash Qeshlaq or Bash Qishlaq or Bashqeshlaq, also rendered as Bashkishlak, may refer to:
 Bash Qeshlaq, Kurdistan
 Bash Qeshlaq, Zanjan
 Bash Qeshlaq, alternate name of Mesgar, Zanjan Province